Viano may refer to:

 Mercedes-Benz Viano, a large people carrier manufactured by Mercedes-Benz
 Viano, Graubünden, a settlement in the municipality of Brusio and canton of Graubünden, Switzerland
 Viano, Reggio Emilia, a town and commune in the province of Reggio Emilia and region of Emilia-Romagna, Italy